John Butte (fl. 1366), was an English politician.

He was a Member (MP) of the Parliament of England for Gloucester in 1366.

References

English MPs 1366